The 2011–12 season was Valencia Club de Fútbol's 94th in existence and the club's 25th consecutive season in the top flight of Spanish football. The season was the fourth season of Unai Emery in front of team.

Squad

Players
The numbers are established according to the official website: www.valenciacf.com

From Valencia Mestalla

Out on loan

Detailed squad information

Notes: (d), debut in first team in an official match

Transfers

In 

Total expenditure:  €27,400,000

Out 

Total income:  €40,500,000

Club

Current technical staff

Source: Valencia CF Official Website

Statistics

Player stats

{| class="wikitable sortable" style="text-align: center;"
!width=30|
!width=30|P
!width=110|Name
!width=30|
!width=30|
!width=30|
!width=30|
!width=40|
!width=40|
!width=40|
!width=40|
!width=40|
!width=40|
!width=40|
!width=40|
!width=40|
!align=left|Notes

Goals for goalkeepers are goals against

Disciplinary record
Includes all competitive matches. The list is sorted by shirt number.

Pre-season and friendlies

Competitions

Overall

Overall Friendly Trophies

Source: Fiendlies

Qualifying for next season competitions

La Liga

League table

Results summary

Results by round

Matches

Copa del Rey

Round of 32

Round of 16

Quarter-finals

Semi-finals

UEFA Champions League

Group stage

UEFA Europa League

Knockout phase

Round of 32

Round of 16

Quarter-finals

Semi-finals

2011–12 Valencia Féminas season

Current squad

Competitions

Primera División

Results summary

League table

Matches

References

External links
 Official website 

Spanish football clubs 2011–12 season
2011-12
2011–12 UEFA Champions League participants seasons
2011–12 UEFA Europa League participants seasons